Amor a Palos is a Venezuelan telenovela made by Radio Caracas Television in 2005 and distributed internationally by RCTV International. Its protagonists, Norkys Batista and Lucian D'Alessandro, won the Dos de Oro award for Best actress/actor in a telenovela. It was written by Martín Hahn and executive produced by Jhony Pulido Mora.

Synopsis 
In the middle of a cosmopolitan city, lives Ana Jesús Amaral, a decent girl with profound Christian morals is the victim of a misogynistic society.

Convinced that women would be a great power if they had the idea of helping each other, she has the following slogan: "Defend your dignity, woman". She starts a campaign to support a famous journalist Patricia Lara, in a civil case concerning the maintenance of her husband.

In this environment, Ana finds herself once again with Juan Marco Coronel, an innocent love from her childhood and the first man who kissed her.  Now that little boy turned into a bright lawyer, and just happens to be the defence attorney in the Patricia Lara case.

Juan Marco is a womanizer whose purpose is to win a bet he made with his friend Luis Lam. Luis bet him $100,000 that he couldn't sleep with 70 women in one year.

Ana Jesús is the seventieth woman he will have to seduce. It will be no simple task, but Juan Marcos is a betting man. On the way towards achieving his goal, he will discover hope and a new opportunity to love.  She will meet his match, but destiny will make an unexpected move: she will become pregnant. How can a womanizer conquer the love of his life with lies?

Ana Jesús won't be an easy prisoner and much less with the help of three women who like her, have the special talent of being able to change men.

Greta will discover the most terrible weapons that women have to manipulate men: feelings.  Ana Jesús will gain the respect of the man who humiliated her, while always defending a woman's dignity.

Magdalena, in her thirties, with patience and traps will get the man she loves.  And finally Miss Revueltas, who in her late single status, will discover the positive side of sharing her bed with a man, on the hunt for her most prized dream, motherhood.

All of them together form a clan of women, who will force men to be the way they imagine them to be which is the ideal man.

Cast 
Norkys Batista as Ana Jesús Amaral
Luciano D'Alessandro as Juan Marco Coronel
Hilda Abrahamz as Pamela Jhonson...villain
Natalia Ramírez as Magdalena Lam De Soriano
Alejandro López as Jairo Restrepo Moreira
Emma Rabbe as Virginia Revueltas
Roberto Messutti as Rene Cardenas
Dora Mazzone as Auxiliadora Amaral De Moreira
Eliana López as Oriana Ponce De León...villain, later good
Nacarid Escalona as Elvirita Quintana
Javier Valcárcel as Bonifacio Cañas
Leonardo Marrero as Victorino Soriano...villain
Miguel Augusto Rodríguez as Beltrán Ponce De León...villain, later good
Giancarlo Pasqualotto as Luis Lam...villain
Miguel Ferrari as Numa Custodio Moreira...villain, later good
Abril Schreiber as Greta Jhonson
Manuel Sosa as Wilfredo Zapata
Susana Duijm as Maya Jhonson
Kiara as Patricia Lara
Juliet Lima as Rocío Vargas
Yoletti Cabrera as Doris Salcedo
Patricia Ramos as Julieta Vargas
Ivette Domínguez as Thelma Fernández
Abelardo Behna as Lorenzo Jordán
Kimberly Dos Ramos as Julieta Soriano Lam
Gabriel López as Romano Restrepo
Miguel Gutiérrez as Zacarías Moreira
Vanessa Montes as Ruthy Moreira
Belén Peláez as Paola Freitas
Alexander Espinoza as Fermín Acosta
Brenda Hanst as Selena Granados
Yesenia Cuan as Kenya Impala
Ezzio Cavallaro as  El Hombre
Carly Pinto as Marbella Colorado

Songs
Other songs
"Buscando un Final" performed by Ilona is the background music for Greta and Wilfre.
"Amor a Palo Limpio" performed by Kiara feat. Jose Pablo is the background music for Virginia and Jairo.
"Que Estas Buscando" performed by Axel Fernando is the background music for Magdalena and Rene.

References

2005 telenovelas
2005 Venezuelan television series debuts
2006 Venezuelan television series endings
RCTV telenovelas
Venezuelan telenovelas
Spanish-language telenovelas
Television shows set in Venezuela